The Daily Mirror Mid-Ulster Football League, or simply referred to as the Mid-Ulster League, is an association football league in Northern Ireland. It contains 9 divisions. These comprise two intermediate sections: the Intermediate A and Intermediate B divisions; three junior sections: Division 1, Division 2 and Division 3; and four reserve sections: Reserve 1, Reserve 2 and Reserve 3 and Reserve 4. The current champions are Ballymacash Rangers F.C.

Clubs in membership (2019–20)

Format 
The league season lasts from August to May with each club playing the others twice, once at their home ground and once at that of their opponents. Teams receive three points for a win and one point for a draw. No points are awarded for a loss. Teams are ranked by total points, then goal difference, and then goals scored.

Intermediate A
For the 2017–18 season there are 14 clubs, each playing a total of 26 games. The league champions can be promoted to NIFL Premier Intermediate League, providing they meet the admission requirements.
Normally the two lowest placed teams are relegated to the Intermediate B division, or lowest three placed teams if the division receives a team relegated from the NIFL Premier Intermediate League and fails to promote a team in return.

Intermediate B
For the 2017–18 season there are 13 clubs, each playing a total of 24 games. The two highest placed teams are promoted into the Intermediate A division. If the Intermediate A division receives a team relegated from the NIFL Premier Intermediate League and fails to promote a team in return, it will relegate three teams to the Intermediate B division, requiring the team finishing bottom of the Intermediate B division to be relegated to Junior Division 1.

Junior Divisions 1–3
There are three divisions which have junior status: Division 1, Division 2 and Division 3. The league winner can be promoted into the Intermediate section as long as their ground meets Intermediate standards.

Reserves 1–4
There are four divisions for reserve sides. The divisions are called Reserve 1, Reserve 2, Reserve 3 and Reserve 4

List of champions

Banbridge Rangers were awarded the title on a points per game basis after the league was cut short due to the COVID-19 pandemic.

References

http://www.midulsterfootballleague.co.uk/NewsArticle.aspx?&nid=1722&p=2

External links 
 
 nifootball.co.uk - (For fixtures, results and tables of all Northern Ireland amateur football leagues)

 
4
North